Talpa may refer to:

Places
 Talpa, Iran, a village in Khuzestan Province, Iran
 Talpa, Teleorman, a commune in Teleorman County, Romania
 Talpa, a village in Cândeşti Commune, Botoşani County, Romania
 Talpa, a village in Bârgăuani Commune, Neamţ  County, Romania
 Talpa, New Mexico, a village in Taos County
 Talpa, Texas, a village in Texas
 Talpa de Allende, a city in Jalisco, Mexico

Other uses
 Talpa Network, a Dutch media company
 Talpa Media, a Dutch television production company
 Tien (TV channel), a former television channel in the Netherlands also known as Talpa
 Talpa (mammal), a genus of moles
 Talpa (Ronin Warriors), a character from the anime Ronin Warriors
 Talpa (film), a 1956 Mexican film